Luke Dean (21 June 1913 – 1975) was an English footballer who played as a forward for Port Vale and Northwich Victoria.

Career
Dean played for Downing's Tileries, before joining Port Vale in August 1934. He featured in ten Second Division games in the 1934–35 season, and scored two of his first goals in the English Football League on 9 February, in a 2–2 draw with Burnley at Turf Moor. Seven days later he claimed another goal in a 2–0 win over Oldham Athletic at The Old Recreation Ground. He played nine games in the 1935–36 relegation season, and scored goals against Nottingham Forest and Sheffield United. He made 13 Third Division North appearances in the 1936–37 campaign, and claimed goals against Mansfield Town, Gateshead, Rotherham United, and Lincoln City. He was given a free transfer to Northwich Victoria in August 1937.

Career statistics
Source:

References

Sportspeople from Hanley, Staffordshire
English footballers
Association football forwards
Port Vale F.C. players
Northwich Victoria F.C. players
English Football League players
1913 births
1975 deaths